Nader Goli (also Romanized as Nāder Golī) is a village in, and the capital of, Nader Goli Rural District of the Central District of Baruq County, West Azerbaijan province, Iran. At the 2006 National Census, its population was 735 in 143 households, when it was in Baruq Rural District of Baruq District of Miandoab County. The following census in 2011 counted 700 people in 198 households. The latest census in 2016 showed a population of 777 people in 206 households. After the census, Baruq District was separated from Miandoab County, elevated to the status of a county, and divided into two districts.

References 

Populated places in West Azerbaijan Province